Antoon van der Steen (19 January 1936 – 31 October 2019) was a Dutch racing cyclist. He rode in the 1961 Tour de France.

Major results
1958
 2nd Ronde van Overijssel
1959
 3rd Overall Olympia's Tour
1960
 1st Stage 2 Tour de Luxembourg
 3rd Road race, National Road Championships
 3rd Circuit des XI Villes
 4th Overall Ronde van Nederland
 4th GP Fichtel & Sachs
 5th Overall Deutschland Tour
 8th Gent–Wevelgem
1961
 1st Stage 5a Ronde van Nederland

References

External links
 

1936 births
2019 deaths
Dutch male cyclists
People from Etten-Leur
Cyclists from North Brabant